Julie A. Morrison (born September 20, 1956) is a member of the Illinois Senate from the 29th district. The 29th district includes all or parts of Arlington Heights, Buffalo Grove, Bannockburn, Deerfield, Glencoe, Glenview, Highland Park, Lake Bluff, Lake Forest, Lincolnshire, Northbrook and North Chicago. Prior to her service in the Illinois Senate, she was the West Deerfield Township Supervisor.

Early life, education, and career
Morrison was born and grew up in Beardstown, Illinois. She attended Knox College and graduated with a bachelor's in political science. She took a job with the Natural Gas Pipeline Company of America before being appointed to the Advisory Council for the Department of Children and Family Services where she served until 1996. During her final two years she served as chair of the commission. In 1997 she was elected West Deerfield Township Supervisor. As Supervisor she was the chief executive officer, chairman of the board of trustees and treasurer of all funds. She handled the daily operations of the administration building.

Illinois Senate
In 2011, Morrison announced her intention to run for state senate to replace the retiring Susan Garrett. She easily defeated Milton Sumpton in the primary and went on to face Arie Friedman in the general election.

In the general election, Morrison was endorsed by State Representative Karen May, State Representative Elaine Nekritz, Senator Susan Garrett, Assistant Senate Majority Leader Jeffrey Schoenberg, Congresswoman Jan Schakowsky and former Congressman John Porter.

Morrison won the election to become the next state senator from the 29th district.

As of July 2022, Senator Morrison is a member of the following Illinois Senate committees:

 Appropriations - State Law Enforcement Committee (SAPP-SASL)
 (Chairwoman of) Appropriations - Health Committee (SAPP-SAHA)
 Appropriations Committee (SAPP)
 Environment and Conservation Committee (SNVR)
 Ethics Committee (SETH)
 Financial Institutions Committee (SFIC)
 (Chairwoman of) Health Committee (SHEA)
 (Chairwoman of) Redistricting - Lake & McHenry Counties (SRED-SRLM)
 (Chairwoman of) Subcommittee on Special Issues (H) (SHEA-SHSI)

Personal life
Morrison witnessed the Highland Park parade shooting. She was at the parade with her family at the time; all of them survived uninjured.

References

External links
Biography, bills and committees at the 98th Illinois General Assembly
By session: 98th
Illinois State Senator Julie Morrison constituency site
 
Julie Morrison at Illinois Senate Democrats
2012 Editorial Board Questionnaire at the Chicago Tribune

21st-century American politicians
21st-century American women politicians
1956 births
Living people
Democratic Party Illinois state senators
Knox College (Illinois) alumni
People from Beardstown, Illinois
People from Deerfield, Illinois
Women state legislators in Illinois